The Bureau of Energy, Ministry of Economic Affairs (BOE) is the administrative agency of the Ministry of Economic Affairs of the Republic of China (Taiwan) responsible for energy-related affairs.

History
The BOE was originally established as Energy Development Group in July 1968 under the International Economic Cooperation and Development Council of the Executive Yuan. In January 1970, the group was renamed the Energy Policy Deliberation Group and became a subordinate of the Ministry of Economic Affairs. On 1 November 1979, the Energy Commission was established under the ministry. On 1 July 2004, the Bureau of Energy was established.

Organizational structure
 Planning Division
 Petroleum and Gas Division
 Electricity Division
 Energy Technology Division
 Secretariat
 Personnel Office
 Accounting Office
 Civil Service Ethics Office
 Legal Affairs Office

Director-generals
 Wang Yunn-ming
 Yu Cheng-wei (incumbent)

Transportation
The bureau is accessible within walking distance south of Nanjing Fuxing Station of Taipei Metro.

See also
 Ministry of Economic Affairs (Taiwan)
 Nuclear power in Taiwan

References

External links
 

1968 establishments in Taiwan
Executive Yuan
Government agencies established in 1968
Government of Taiwan